Fraud is a 2022 Pakistani television drama series written by Zanjabeel Asim Shah, directed by Saqib Khan and produced by Abdullah Seja under the banner iDream Entertainment. Starring Saba Qamar, Ahsan Khan and Mikaal Zulfiqar in lead roles in their second on-screen appearance together after eleven years, the series is set in Lahore and Karachi. It debuted on ARY Digital on 14 May 2022.

Plot

Nisar dreams of marrying his two daughters, Maya and Maila, off to rich and fancy people, and because of this, he fixes Maya's engagement with Tabraiz, a rich man who lives with his parents, Khawar and Jahanara in a big mansion. After Tabraiz and Maya's wedding, Tabraiz Starts to Care for Maya and she begins to love him . Later ,Tabraiz learns that his uncle died, so he and his parents leave Pakistan for a while, leaving Maya at her parents' house.

After no contact with Tabraiz or his parents for more than two weeks, Nisar and his nephew Nael file a missing person report with the police for Tabraiz, but after looking at Tabraiz's picture, the police officer tells Nisar and Nael that Tabraiz and his parents are actually fraudsters, and his real name is Shujat who steal all of women's jewellery and money after getting Tabraiz married to them, and then running away, and they find out that their mansion actually belongs to someone else. Out of grief and guilt, Nisar decides to have Maya marry Nael, but he rejects this at the last minute for revenge because Nisar rejected Nael's proposal for Maya earlier before her marriage to Tabraiz.

Meanwhile, Tabraiz, disguising himself as Choudhary Hashim, and his parents, who are actually his business partners in crime, rob a Punjabi woman named Rehana, but Tabraiz leaves his partners after not receiving his share he was promised. Tabraiz then meets Tooba at an ATM stand, and Tooba's driver tells Tabraiz that Tooba is part of the Shaan Textiles business. Tabraiz then becomes friends with Tooba and introduces himself as Shujaat, which is revealed to be his real name, to her. Tooba and Shujaat then start dating. Tooba is the stepsister of Shaan, and Shaan has a daughter named Zimmal, but his wife Simra leaves him to go to America with Zimmal. Tooba's mother and Shaan's stepmother, Kulsoom tries to convince Shaan to forget about Simra, but Simra returns to keep Zimmal with Shaan, since Simra doesn't want to keep her.

Maya, Nisar and her mother Shehnaz decide to move to Lahore, where Maya gets a job at Shaan Textiles and she meets Kulsoom, who is impressed by Maya. Before moving to Lahore, Maila married officer Talaal, but after Talaal is murdered, Maila moves with her family to Lahore as well. Maya then meets Zimmal, but Shaan tells Maya to stay away from her, as he does not trust women after Simra left him. Later, Tooba and Shujaat marry, to which then Kulsoom decides to get Shaan and Maya married, to which they agree after previously refusing. It is revealed that Shujaat is poor, and has a poor mother and sick father in Punjab, but he can't make them meet Tooba because he lied to her saying that his parents died, and his parents are unaware of his fraud business.

Shaan and Maya gradually develop feelings for each other and become closer after their marriage, but one day when Shaan and Maya are going to meet her parents, Maya reunites with Shujaat, who becomes disturbed and shocked. Maya also becomes disturbed, and Shujaat then learns from Tooba about Maya's two failed marriages, the first with Shujaat himself and the second with Nael, which never happened. Shujaat then threatens Maya to not reveal his truth, or else he will reveal Maya's two failed marriages to Shaan, as Nisar didn't tell Shaan that Maya had previously been married and had even been robbed, out of the fear that Shaan will leave Maya, so both Maya and Shujaat maintain each other's secrets.

Tired of being threatened by Shujaat, Maya goes to Kulsoom and Tooba and she tells them the truth about Shujaat, that he was her first husband and that he is a fraud. Shujaat tries to defend himself but Tooba breaks down after feeling betrayed and sends Shujaat away. Shujaat goes to Kulsoom and convinces her that he will help her rob Shaan, so Kulsoom brings Shujaat back to their house, much to Maya's displeasure. Nael wants to redeem himself after not marrying Maya, so he marries Maila. Shujaat and Kulsoom then collaborate to rob Shaan. Kulsoom then informs Shaan that Maya was previously married, but Maya tells Shaan that she was married to Shujaat. So Shaan expels both Maya and Shujaat from the house.

When Maya tells her parents this, Nisar tells Maya to fight against Shujaat, but Tooba and Kulsoom emotionally blackmail Shaan by telling him that Tooba is pregnant with Shujaat's child, so that Kulsoom can continue to rob Shaan with Shujaat's help. Shaan then decides to bring Shujaat back to their house. Shujaat asks for forgiveness from Shaan and Tooba but they brush him off. Shaan takes Zimmal to America to meet Simra, but before that, Shaan gives Kulsoom the power of attorney and ownership of his company. After Shaan returns, he finds out that Kulsoom robbed him, and she tells Shaan that he has nothing now and they have no relationship. Simra calls Shaan and explains that Shaan always portrays women in front of him as bad women, like Maya. Shaan then realizes his mistakes. 

Meanwhile, Maya goes to the police to file a complaint against Shujaat but the officer says he can't because, secretly, the officer is working for Jahanara. Jahanara tells him not to worry. Shujaat tries to steal money from Kulsoom for his father's surgery, but after she finds out, she expels Shujaat from the house. In the car, Shujaat's mother calls him and says his father is no more. This breaks Shujaat's heart. He then tells his friend Fanny about planning something new. Meanwhile, Shaan and Zimmal leave their house and go to Maya's house. Shaan asks for forgiveness from Maya, and she forgives him. Shaan starts a new garment business, and he and Maya regain their love and trust in one another. Shaan and Maya then decide to fight against Shujaat with the women Shujaat robbed, and hire all those women in their garment business.

Shujaat hires a hacker to steal all of the money from Kulsoom's account. Kulsoom suffers a heart attack and apologizes to Maya and Shaan, then Kulsoom hands the power of attorney of her company to Maya. On Nael's birthday, Maila is revealed to be pregnant and Nisar and Shehnaz visit her. Fanny then finds a girl named Nawal for Shujaat after robbing Kulsoom and Tooba, and he meets Nawal's grandmother, who accepts Shujaat and Nawal's relationship. Shujaat, Fanny, Nawal and her grandmother arrive at her house, where Shujaat is shocked to see that Maya, Tooba, and the other women he robbed are standing there, with three police officers standing behind Shujaat. 

It is revealed that Nawal's grandmother is a senior police officer, and Fanny went to her to trap Shujaat, under the excuse of his and Nawal's marriage. Shaan reveals that Shujaat's whole gang, including Khawar and Jahanara, have been arrested and the corrupt police officer who Maya went to has been suspended. Tooba tells Shujaat "once a cheater is always a cheater" and she tells him to go to hell, while Maya tells Shujaat that the jail bars await him. Shujaat is taken away by the police.

Cast

Lead
 Saba Qamar as Maya Nisar : Shajji's Former Wife and Shaan's wife.
 Ahsan Khan as Shujaat "Shajji" Atray/Tabraiz Khawar/Choudhary Hashim : Maya's Former Husband and Tooba's Husband
 Mikaal Zulfiqar as Shaan : Maya's second Husband

Recurring
 Mehmood Aslam as Nisar (Maya and Maila's father)
 Asma Abbas as Kulsoom, Shaan's stepmother
 Kinza Razzak as Simra (Shaan's ex-wife)
 Nida Mumtaz as Shehnaz Nisar (Maya and Maila's mother)
 Nazli Nasr as Shazia (Nail's mother and Nisar's sister)
 Annie Zaidi as Jahanara/Farzana
 Saife Hassan as Khawar
 Rabya Kulsoom as Maila Nisar Khan (Maya's younger sister and Talal's widow)
 Adnan Samad Khan as Nael (Shazia's only son)
 Aamna Malick as Rehana
 Hassan Shahnawaz Zaidi
 Farah Nadeem as Mrs . Khan , Talal's mother
 Naeema Butt as Tooba (Shaan's stepsister)
 Alee Hassan Shah as Talal Khan : Malia's Husband (Dead) 
 Marhoom Ahmad Bilal as Fanny
 Tipu Sultan
 Roohi Khan
 Ahmed Bilal
 Izzah Malik
 Salma Qadir as Shama (Shehnaz's friend)
 Hiba
 Sohail Masood
 Syed Sharafat Ali Shah

Production
The series was announced in December 2021, with Qamar, Khan and Zulfiqar in the leading cast in their second project together, the first being Pani Jaisa Piyar in 2011. It is the fourth project featuring Khan opposite Qamar, previously featured in Dastaan, Pani Jaisa Piyar, Na Kaho Tum Mere Nahi and Moomal Rano.

Reception

Ratings

Soundtrack

References

External links
 

Pakistani television series
2022 Pakistani television series debuts